
Gmina Opalenica is an urban-rural gmina (administrative district) in Nowy Tomyśl County, Greater Poland Voivodeship, in west-central Poland.

Villages
Apart from the town of Opalenica, Gmina Opalenica contains the villages and settlements of Dakowy Mokre, Drapak, Jastrzębniki, Kopanki, Kozłowo, Łagwy, Łęczyce, Niegolewo, Porażyn, Porażyn-Dworzec, Porażyn-Ośrodek, Porażyn-Tartak, Rudniki, Sielinko, Sielinko-Osada, Stary Bukowiec, Terespotockie, Troszczyn, Urbanowo, Uścięcice and Wojnowice.

Neighbouring gminas
Gmina Opalenica is bordered by the gminas of Buk, Duszniki, Granowo, Grodzisk Wielkopolski, Kuślin and Nowy Tomyśl.

References

External links
Polish official population figures 2006

Opalenica
Nowy Tomyśl County